Bonnie Anderson may refer to:

 Bonnie Anderson (Episcopalian), former president of the House of Deputies in the Episcopal Church in the United States
 Bonnie Anderson (singer) (born 1994), Australian singer/songwriter
 Bonnie M. Anderson (born 1956), American news journalist
 Bonnie Anderson (Toy Story), a character in the film Toy Story 3